Raja Ko Rani Se Pyar Ho Gaya (English: The king has fallen in love with the queen) is a 2000 Indian Hindi film directed by T. K. Rajeev Kumar, starring Arvind Swamy and Manisha Koirala. This is the second Hindi film after Saat Rang Ke Sapne that Arvind Swamy has ever acted in. The film commenced after the success of the Hindi version of Mani Ratnam's Bombay, which featured the same lead pair. However the release was delayed by three years, until the producers won a PETA case filed against them.

Cast
 Arvind Swamy as Mohit Kumar
 Manisha Koirala as Manisha Malhotra 
 Dilip Dhawan as Rohit Kumar
 Vanessa Francis as Raji
 Jennifer Winget as Tanu
 Dina Pathak as Mohit's grandmother
Shahbaz Khan 
Nawab Shah 
Sushma Seth as Manisha's mother
Tanvi Azmi as Meera Kumar
Rakesh Bedi as Balu

Production
Producer Mohan encouraged Rajeev to do this film in Hindi as this plot would have a wider market and Rajeev felt this won't work out in Malayalam because of the fantasy element in the script.

Controversy
The film became controversial for the scene where Manisha plays with the elephant's tail.

Music
Given by Jatin–Lalit, with lyrics by Javed Akhtar, audio on T-Series.

References

External links

2000 films
2000s Hindi-language films
Films scored by Jatin–Lalit
Films about elephants
Indian children's films
Films shot in Rajasthan
Films based on fairy tales
Films directed by T. K. Rajeev Kumar
2000s children's films